The ghost skink (Eremiascincus phantasmus) is a species of skink found in Australia.

References

Eremiascincus
Reptiles described in 2013
Taxa named by Sven Mecke
Taxa named by Paul Doughty
Taxa named by Steve Donnellan (scientist)